Burum is a village in eastern Yemen. It is located in the Hadhramaut Governorate.

References

Populated places in Hadhramaut Governorate